Vegaviidae is an extinct family of ornithurines, often regarded as stem-anseriforms, which existed during the Late Cretaceous and possibly the Paleocene. Fossils attributed to the family have been found in Canada, Chile, New Zealand, and Antarctica.

Previously the genera Neogaeornis and Polarornis were classified as stem-loons based on the similarities in the anatomy of the leg structure. However, there were some criticism to these assertions as the material are from incomplete specimens from Antarctica lacking several important loon characteristics.

In 2017 Agnolín and colleagues performed a phylogenetic analysis of these genera in addition to the newly discovered Australornis and Vegavis, the latter genus of which a more complete specimen had been found. This allowed the team to do anatomical comparisons between these genera. They found support for them making up a family of birds showing specializations to diving, classified as the sister taxon to crown Anseriformes. This was interpreted as evidence that some families of modern birds crossed the K–Pg boundary unaffected by the extinction event that occurred. The authors also stated this is further evidence of Gondwana having an important role for the evolution of modern birds.

Another 2017 paper by Worthy et al. focusing on the evolution and phylogenetic relationships of giant fowl found weak support for Vegaviidae being the sister taxon to Gastornithiformes (the clade including Gastornithidae and the mihirungs).

The description and phylogenetic placement of Maaqwi by McLachlan et al. (2017) found an alternative position for vegaviids as stem-birds in the more inclusive clade Ornithurae.

In 2018 Mayr and colleagues did a review of vegaviid systematics stating that while Vegavis and Polarornis are likely sister genera based on overall similarities in their femur and tibiotarsal bones, the inclusion of other taxa, particularly Australornis, is poorly supported. Furthermore, comparison of the plesiomorphic traits of the pterygoid and the mandible does not seem to firmly establish anseriform or galloanserine affinities for Vegaviidae. Mayr et al. (2018) commented that to try to classify all southern hemisphere birds into a single clade is premature as it may not illustrate the complex relationships and the convergent evolution birds have undergone.

References

Prehistoric dinosaur families
Late Cretaceous first appearances
Tertiary extinctions of vertebrate taxa
Prehistoric ornithurans